Howling III (also known as Howling III: The Marsupials and The Marsupials: The Howling III) is a 1987 Australian horror film and the sequel to The Howling, directed by Philippe Mora and filmed on location in and around Sydney, Australia. Starring Barry Otto, Imogen Annesley and Max Fairchild, Howling III is the only PG-13 rated entry in the Howling film series and also the last film in the series to be released theatrically. In this sequel, werewolves have evolved, with females having marsupial-like pouches to nurse their young. Scientists attempt to study them, while soldiers try to track and kill them in the Australian Outback.

Although Gary Brandner, author of the Howling novel series, approved the director's purchase of the rights to the name The Howling and the screen credits claim that it is based on Brandner's novel  The Howling III: Echoes, the novel is set in the United States and has a different story than the film, with only slight similarities in terms of plot and a sympathetic view of werewolves. This aspect would be revisited in Howling VI: The Freaks.

Plot
Harry Beckmeyer, an Australian anthropologist, obtains film footage from 1905 which shows Australian Aborigines ceremonially sacrificing a wolf-like creature. Alarmed by the reports of a werewolf killing a man in Siberia, Beckmeyer tries to warn the U.S. president about widespread werewolf attacks, but the president is dismissive. Jerboa, a young Australian werewolf, flees her sexually abusive stepfather, Thylo. After spending the night on a park bench near the Sydney Opera House, she is spotted by a young American, Donny Martin, who offers her a role in a horror film, Shape Shifters Part 8. Jack Citron, the film's director, praises her natural talent and hires her immediately.

After Jerboa and Donny attend a film which depicts a werewolf transforming, she insists the scene is inaccurate and admits she is a werewolf to an unbelieving Donny. After they have sex, Donny notices that Jerboa's lower abdomen is covered in downy white fur and a large scar. At the wrap party for the film, Jerboa is exposed to strobe lights and starts transforming. She flees the party and is hit by a car. At the hospital, doctors find she has a marsupial-like pouch and striped fur on her back like a thylacine, an extinct carnivorous marsupial. They also discover that Jerboa is pregnant and question Donny about her unusual anatomy.

Beckmeyer's father disappears in the Outback shortly after recording a film of tribal villagers killing a werewolf. Three of Jerboa's sisters track her to Sydney and take her back to the pack's hidden werewolf town, Flow (wolf spelled backwards). Beckmeyer and his colleague Professor Sharp spend the evening watching a visiting ballet troupe practice. They witness the prima ballerina, the Russian Olga Gorki, transform into a werewolf—to the horror of her troupe. After being captured and taken to a laboratory, she quickly escapes. She makes her way to Flow, where the pack wants her to be Thylo's mate.

Jerboa gives birth to a baby werewolf which crawls into her pouch. Donny informs Beckmeyer that his girlfriend is from Flow and they attempt to find her. Jerboa smells Donny nearby and meets him at night. She shows him their baby boy and tells him about the impending danger; they flee to the hills. The next morning, a government task force captures the werewolf pack. Beckmeyer convinces Olga to allow scientists to study her and Thylo. After Thylo is tortured with strobe lights to make him transform, Beckmeyer frees him and Olga. The trio escape into the Outback and find Kendi, Donny, Jerboa and the baby.

Kendi summons the spirit of a phantom wolf which massacres hunters pursuing the group. Kendi is cremated, but the smoke alerts soldiers still in pursuit of the pack. Kendi's skeleton attacks the soldiers before being destroyed by a soldier's machine gun. At night, Thylo also summons the spirit and is transformed into a huge wolf. He attacks the remaining soldiers before being killed by a bazooka blast that destroys the rest of the encampment. Olga and Beckmeyer fall in love and hide with Jerboa and Donny at an idyllic riverside camp. Eventually, Jerboa and Donny leave, assuming new identities; the Beckmeyers remain behind to raise their daughter and newborn son. Sharp locates Harry and informs him that all lycanthropes have been given amnesty due to the crimes committed against them. The Beckmeyers move back to the city.

While teaching a class in Los Angeles, Beckmeyer is approached by a young man who introduces himself as Zack, Jerboa and Donny's son. Zack informs Beckmeyer that his parents are living in Los Angeles under new identities: Jerboa is now the famous actress "Loretta Carson" and Donny is the famous director "Sully Spellingberg". That night, Olga and Beckmeyer watch Jerboa win a best actress award on a television show hosted by Dame Edna Everage. As Jerboa accepts the award, the flashing cameras and stage lights cause her to change into a werewolf. Olga also transforms, to her husband's dismay. Jerboa goes on the attack as her sisters howl in glee; Sharp laughs deviously in his living room as the camera zooms in on a framed photo of a thylacine that Sharp has hanging up.

Cast
 Barry Otto as Professor Harry Beckmeyer
 Imogen Annesley as Jerboa
 Max Fairchild as Thylo
 Ralph Cotterill as Professor Sharp
 Leigh Biolos as Donny Martin
 Frank Thring as Jack Citron
 Michael Pate as President
 Barry Humphries as Academy Award Presenter
 Carole Skinner as Yara
 Brian Adams as General Miller 
 Christopher Pate as Agent
 Dagmar Bláhová as Olga Gork
 Burnum Burnum as Kendi
 Steve Shaw as Horror Movie Actor
 Bob Barrett as Policeman
 Fred Welsh as Dan Ruggle
 John Ewing as General Forster

Production
Howling III is considered a standalone film in the Howling series. Though Philippe Mora directed Howling II: Your Sister Is a Werewolf, Howling III features no references or characters from the previous two films. The werewolves in Howling III are also portrayed more sympathetically.

Mora had been unhappy with Howling IIs story and how the producers added extra footage, such as additional shots of breasts, after he left. Mora wanted to make a third film himself to make amends and raised the money himself with co-producer Charles Waterstreet.

Home video
The film was first released on DVD by Elite Entertainment in 2001. The out-of-print DVD contained a widescreen print of the film, trailers, and an audio commentary by the director. In 2007, Timeless Media Group released a pan and scan DVD and Blu-ray of the film with no bonus material.

Scream Factory released Howling III on Blu-ray in North America on 15 January 2019, with extra features, both new and vintage.

Critical reception 
Vincent Canby of The New York Times wrote: "If you only see one werewolf movie this year, you might as well make it Howling III, Philippe Mora's not-altogether straight-faced howler on behalf of lycanthropes' liberation". Variety noted that the film "will have a career on video, but should also please the buffs in theaters ... Mora knows his horror films, and has great fun sending them up". Leonard Klady of the Los Angeles Times called it "a campy recycling of familiar fangoria that is fitfully entertaining". Dave Kehr of the Chicago Tribune awarded 1 star out of 4 and wrote that the film "seems destined to languish in dusty obscurity on the higher shelves of less discriminating video stores. Director Philippe Mora, who also filmed the dismal Howling II, here gives up any attempt to create a serious horror film, allowing the project to slither quietly into the swamp of self-conscious camp". Richard Harrington of The Washington Post wrote: "Howling III is much better than the shoddy II but nowhere near as sharp as the Joe Dante original ... Mora's got some intriguing strands to weave together, but the film has no internal rhythm (though it has incessant and usually inadequate music pulsing under every scene). The changeovers are surprisingly mild in this age of great special-effects expectations. Perhaps it's because the director seems unsure how he really feels about werewolves".

The film holds a 23% approval rating with an average rating of 3.9/10 on the review aggregate website Rotten Tomatoes based on 13 reviews.

In the Australian comedy film Death in Brunswick (1990), there is a scene in which Carl (Sam Neill) meets Sophie (Zoe Carides) for a date in a local cinema only to discover they're attending a matinee session of Howling III attended mainly by children.

References

External links
 
 
 
The Howling III at Oz Movies

1987 films
1987 horror films
1980s comedy horror films
1987 independent films
Australian independent films
1980s English-language films
Films based on American horror novels
Films shot in Sydney
The Howling films
Werewolf films
Films directed by Philippe Mora
Australian comedy horror films
Australian sequel films